Luis MacGregor Cevallos (1887–1965) was a Mexican architect as well as an author of book on Colonial Mexican architecture.

His son Luis MacGregor Krieger was also an architect.

Architectural works
MacGregor was known for buildings of Modern architecture.
 MacGregor designed the garden at Chapultepec Castle in which a sculpture, La Madre Patria, commemorating the Niños Héroes, is located (1924; sculptor Ignacio Asúnsolo; note this is not the better-known, larger monument to the Niños Héroes, Altar a la Patria)
 Parque Agrícola de la Ciudad de México (plan, 1930), Mexico City
 Hospital Central Militar Mexico (1940)
 Palenque camp and museum
 Restoration works at the Convent at San Agustín de Acolman

Books
MacGregor's books included:
 Huejotzingo: The City and the Franciscan Monastery (1934), with Rafael García Granados
 Actopan (1955)

References

Mexican architects
People from Mexico City
Modernist architects
1887 births
1965 deaths